The Nyctalope, alias Léo Saint-Clair, is a pulp fiction hero created by French writer Jean de La Hire in 1911. He may be the first cyborg (an individual with both organic and mechanical body parts) in literature and is seen as a significant precursor to the superhero genre. The character has an artificial heart and powers such as excellent night vision, which is the source of his name.

Creation
Jean de La Hire (the pen name of Adolphe d'Espi) began his series involving the Nyctalope in 1908 with the novel L'Homme Qui Peut Vivre dans l'Eau (The Man Who Could Live Underwater). The Nyctalope himself does not appear in the story, which stars his father. Léo Saint-Clair, alias the Nyctalope, debuted in the 1911 novel Le Mystère des XV, later translated as The Nyctalope on Mars. The Nyctalope has an artificial heart and other organs, which give him powers and improved senses. Most notably, his enhanced eyes give him excellent night vision, hence the name "Nyctalope".

Description
Stories typically depict the Nyctalope fighting threats to humanity such as dictators, mad scientists, and aliens. Following Le Mystère des XV, La Hire wrote a number of other books and stories featuring the character into the 1940s. The 1933 story L'Assassinat du Nyctalope (The Assassination of the Nyctalope) includes his origin story. The Nyctalope predated comic book superheroes like Superman and Batman by three decades, and is sometimes seen as an early superhero or "proto-superhero". In addition, the fact that he has both mechanical and organic body parts may make him the first cyborg character in fiction (although, the Frankenstein Monster might equally qualify for that title), prefiguring characters like Iron Man, who similarly has had an artificial heart.

Legacy
The Nyctalope remained obscure for years after La Hire's death in 1956. In the 21st century, several of the original works were translated into English either by Brian Stableford or by editor-publishers Jean-Marc  and Randy Lofficier. A new novel, Return of the Nycaclope, written by the Lofficiers, appeared in 2013. The characer also appears in the Lofficiers'  Tales of the Shadowmen anthology series.

The Nyctalope is a main character in Serge Lehman's comic book The Chimera Brigade (published 2009-2010), set just before World War II, and receives mentiones in Volumes 2 and 3 of the graphic novel  seriesThe League of Extraordinary Gentlemen written by Alan Moore and drawn by Kevin O'Neill.

Appearances

Original
 L'Homme Qui Peut Vivre dans l'Eau ("The Man Who Could Live Underwater") (1909) (features only Léo's father)
 Le Mystère des XV ("The Mystery Of The XV") (1911) (first adventure) (translated into English by Brian Stableford as The Nyctalope on Mars , Black Coat Press)
 Lucifer (1921–22) (translated into English by Brian Stableford as "Nyctalope vs Lucifer" , Black Coat Press)
 L'Amazone du Mont Everest ("The Amazon Of Mount Everest") (1925)
 La Captive du Démon ("The Demon's Captive") (1927) (translated into English by Michael Shreve and included in The Nyctalope and the Antichrist, Black Coat Press)
Titania (1928)
 Belzébuth  ("Beelzebub") (1930)
 Gorillard (1932)
 Les Mystères de Lyon ("The Mysteries of Lyon") (1933)
 L'Assassinat du Nyctalope ("The Assassination of the Nyctalope" (1933), an origin story translated into English by Brian Stableford as Enter The Nyctalope , Black Coat Press)
 Le Sphinx du Maroc("The Moroccan Sphinx")(1934)
 La Croisière du Nyctalope ("The Nyctalope's Cruise") (1936)
 Le Maître de la Vie ("The Master of Life") (1938) (translated into English by Michael Shreve and included in The Nyctalope and the Master of Life, Black Coat Press)
 Le Mystère de la Croix du Sang ("The Mystery of the Cross Of Blood") (1940) (adapted into English by  Jessica Sequeira as The Cross of Blood and included in The Nyctalope and The Tower of Babel , Black Coat Press)
 Les Drames de Paris ("The Dramas of Paris") (1941)
 Rien qu'une Nuit ("Only One Night") (1941) (translated into English by Jean-Marc Lofficier & Randy Lofficier and included in Night of the Nyctalope, Black Coat Press)
 L'Enfant Perdu ("The Lost Child") (1942) (translated into English by Jean-Marc Lofficier & Randy Lofficier and included in The Nyctalope Steps In, Black Coat Press)
 Le Roi de la Nuit ("The King Of The Night") (1943) (translated into English by Brian Stableford and included in The Return of the Nyctalope, Black Coat Press)
 La Sorcière Nue ("The Naked Sorceress") (written c. 1940+; publ. 1954)
 L'Énigme du Squelette ("The Enigma of the Skeleton") (written c. 1940+; publ. 1955)

Revival
 The Return of the Nyctalope (2013; by Jean-Marc Lofficier & Randy Lofficier, Black Coat Press)
 "Marguerite" by Jean-Marc Lofficier, included in Gentleman of the Night, the second volume of the anthology series Tales of the Shadowmen (2006)
 "The Heart of the Paris" (2009) in The Vampire of Paris (Volume 5 of the series) (2009)
 "Out of Time" by Emmanuel Gorlier and "The Children of Heracles" by Roman Leary from Grand Guignol (Volume 6 of the series) (2010)
 "Fiat Lux!" by Emmanuel Gorlier, "Death to the Heretic!" by Paul Hugli, and "The Mysterious Island of Dr. Antekirtt" by David Vineyard in Femmes Fatales (Volume 7 of the series) (2010)

Documentation
Shadowmen: Heroes and Villains of French Pulp Fiction: Published in 2003, by Jean-Marc Lofficier and Randy Lofficier, published by Black Coat Press is an encyclopedic guide to some of the most important characters from French fiction, including Nyctalope.

References

External links 
 Le Nyctalope
 English translation of Lucifer
 

America's Best Comics characters
Characters in French novels of the 20th century
Characters in pulp fiction
Literary characters introduced in 1911
Fictional cyborgs
Fictional French people in literature
Novel series
Wold Newton family